Chittagong Hill Tracts Regional Council is the local government body responsible for the welfare and some administrations of the Chittagong Hill Tracts districts, which include Bandarban District, Khagrachari District, and Rangamati Hill District, in Bangladesh and is located in Dhaka, Rangamati. Jyotirindra Bodhipriya Larma also known as Santu Larma is the Chairman of the Chittagong Hill Tracts Regional Council. He is also the chairman of Parbatya Chattagram Jana Samhati Samiti.

History
The Government of Bangladesh was engaged in a low intensity conflict with the Parbatya Chattagram Jana Samhati Samiti, who represented the non-Bengali tribal communities in the Hill Tracts. On 2 December 1997 the Government of Bangladesh signed a peace treaty with the Parbatya Chattagram Jana Samhati Samiti bring an end to the Chittagong Hill Tracts conflict. The Chittagong Hill Tracts Regional Council was established on 27 May 1999 according to the Chittagong Hill Tracts Regional Council Act 1998. In 2010 Bangladesh High Court in a ruling declared the Chittagong Hill Tracts Regional Council illegal and unconstitutional. The ruling was passed on two cases filed by a Bengali settler, M Badiuzzaman in 2000, and Pro Bangladesh Jamaat-e-Islami lawyer, Tajul Islam in 2007. On 3 March 2011 the Appellate Division upheld the verdict of the High Court. The government of Bangladesh and Jyotirindra Bodhipriya Larma, President of Chittagong Hill Tracts Regional Council, filed an appeal against the verdict. On 9 January 2018 Bangladesh Supreme Court stayed the verdict of the High Court.

References

Government of Chittagong
1999 establishments in Bangladesh
Rangamati Hill District